The Malaysian Nationalist Party or  (PNM or NASMA) was a multi racial grouping launched in July 1985 under the banner "Malaysians for Malaysia, for justice, intergrity and progress". Envisioned by its founders as a forum for nonsectarian critics of the Mahathir Mohamad regime as a challenge to the United Malays National Organisation (UMNO), the party's main accomplishment by late 1985 was weakening Pan-Malaysian Islamic Party (PAS) expansion effort.

See also
Politics of Malaysia
List of political parties in Malaysia

References

Political parties established in 1985
1985 establishments in Malaysia
Defunct political parties in Malaysia